Mati Mark (9 March 1941 Pärnu – 21 September 2008 Tallinn) was an Estonian sport shooter and sport personnel.

In 1978 he graduated from Tallinn Pedagogical Institute in physical education.

1961-1659 he won several gold medals at national championships.

1996-1998 he was the head of Estonian Culture Ministry's sport department.

1990–1994 and 1996–2000 he was the president of Estonian Shooting Sport Federation. 2005-2008 he was the vice-president of European Shooting Confederation. 1992-2001 he was a member of Estonian Olympic Committee.

References

Living people
1941 births
2008 deaths
Estonian male sport shooters
Estonian people in sports
Tallinn University alumni
Sportspeople from Pärnu
20th-century Estonian people